Taketa is a city located in Ōita Prefecture, Japan. Taketa may also refer to:

Shinichi Taketa (born 1967), a Japanese journalist and newscaster
Mandie Taketa, wife of Wayne Brady
Taketa, a character in the 2009 film, The Message